Sidney Elmer Simpson (September 20, 1894 – October 26, 1958) was an American politician who served as a U.S. Representative from Illinois from 1943 to 1958. He was a member of the Republican Party.

Born in Carrollton, Illinois, Simpson attended the public schools and graduated from Carrollton High School. During the First World War he served in the United States Army, with overseas service. He was owner of Simpson Motor Co. and Simpson Bus Co. He served as chairman of the Greene County Republican Committee. Simpson also served as member of the executive committee of the County Chairman's Association of Illinois, and as city treasurer of Carrollton for one term. He also served as a member of the Carrollton Board of Education.

Simpson was elected as a Republican to the Seventy-eighth and to the seven succeeding Congresses and served from January 3, 1943, until his death. He served as chairman of the Committee on the District of Columbia (Eighty-third Congress). Simpson voted present on the Civil Rights Act of 1957. Simpson had been renominated to the Eighty-sixth Congress. He died of a heart attack in Pittsfield, Illinois on October 26, 1958. 
He was succeeded in Congress by his wife Edna O. Simpson.

He was interred in Carrollton City Cemetery in Carrollton, Illinois.

See also
List of United States Congress members who died in office (1950–99)

References

1894 births
1958 deaths
United States Army soldiers
People from Carrollton, Illinois
Military personnel from Illinois
Republican Party members of the United States House of Representatives from Illinois
20th-century American politicians
School board members in Illinois
United States Army personnel of World War I